Alice River may refer to:

The following rivers in Queensland, Australia:
Alice River (Barcoo River), a tributary of Barcoo River
Alice River (Black River), a tributary of Black River (Queensland)
Alice River (Far North Queensland), a tributary of Mitchell River (Queensland)
The following settlements in Queensland, Australia:
Alice River, Queensland